Base is the debut and only extended play by South Korean singer-songwriter Jonghyun, released on January 12, 2015 by SM Entertainment. The EP consists of seven tracks and features collaborations with various artists, such as Zion.T, Younha, Wheesung and Iron. Jonghyun penned the lyrics to every song on the EP. The EP was commercially successful, debuting at number one on South Korea's Gaon Album Chart. It also won the Disk Bonsang at the 2016 Golden Disc Awards.

Background and release
Jonghyun collaborated with various artists for his album, such as Younha, Wheesung, Zion.T and Iron. His title song, featuring Iron as the rapper, is called "Crazy (Guilty Pleasure)" and was released digitally on domestic music sites on January 12, 2015, together with the album. He performed in a showcase to introduce the album at the SM Town Coex Artium on January 8, 2015. He told the media before the showcase:

Jonghyun's song, "Beautiful Tonight", was composed as early as 2012 and was inspired by the view of the moon as he was walking home from work one night.

On January 7, Jonghyun released his self-composed song "Déjà-Boo". It is co-produced by Zion.T, who also features on the track. The song is a described as a "retro funk song with a synthesizer comping melody and the funk rhythm of a bass".

On January 8, Jonghyun pre-released "Love Belt", another self-composed song which is a collaborative track with Younha, on MBC FM4U's broadcast of Blue Night. The official music video for "Crazy (Guilty Pleasure)" was released on the same day, it features the rapper Iron who received attention with his performance on Mnet's survival show Show Me the Money 3. The concept of the music video takes after the name of the title song, guilty pleasure which means to enjoy something that you shouldn't. Jonghyun portrays a man who is head over heels for an alluring woman. Jonghyun started his official album promotions on KBS' Music Bank on January 9. Jonghyun's music video to "Crazy (Guilty Pleasure)" was the most watched K-pop video in America and in the world for January 2015. As of 2015, the album has sold around 74,000 copies in South Korea.

Track listing

Charts

Weekly charts

Monthly charts

Year-end charts

Awards and nominations

Release history

References

Kim Jong-hyun (singer) EPs
SM Entertainment EPs
Genie Music EPs
2015 debut EPs
Albums produced by Lee Soo-man
Korean-language EPs